The following list includes notable people who were born or have lived in Waterville, Maine.

Authors and academics 

 David Brancaccio, radio and television journalist; born in Waterville
 Ron Currie Jr., author
 Eric Hooglund, political scientist; born in Waterville
 Richard Hooker, surgeon and author
 Alvin Lombard, inventor
 Marston Morse, mathematician; born in Waterville

Business and philanthropy 

 Sharon H. Abrams, executive director, Maine Children's Home for Little Wanderers
 Gardner Colby, philanthropist, namesake of Colby College
 George Gilman, founder of the Great Atlantic and Pacific Tea Company
 Charles Foster Hathaway, founder of C.F. Hathaway Company shirt company

Military 

 Donald L. Harlow, 2nd chief master sergeant of the Air Force
 Charles Heywood, major general

Politics 

 Walter A. Burleigh, U.S. congressman
 Clinton Clauson, mayor and 66th Governor of Maine
 Samuel S. Conner, U.S. congressman
 Pam Iorio, 57th mayor of Tampa
 Charles Fletcher Johnson, U.S. senator and judge
 David Lemoine, state treasurer of Maine
 Paul LePage, mayor of Waterville, 74th Governor of Maine
 Nelson Madore, professor and Mayor of Waterville (1999–2004)
 George J. Mitchell, U.S. senator
 Wyman B. S. Moor, U.S. senator
 Edmund Muskie, U.S. senator; 64th Governor of Maine, Secretary of State, 1968 vice presidential candidate
 Jane Muskie, First Lady of Maine
 Charles P. Nelson, U.S. congressman
 Bruce Poliquin, U.S. congressman, state treasurer of Maine
 Samuel Shapiro, Maine State Treasurer (1981–1996)

Religion 

 Donald Edmond Pelotte, Roman Catholic bishop

Sports 

 Dan Bolduc, hockey forward with the Detroit Red Wings, U.S. team in the 1976 Winter Olympics, and at Harvard University
 John Huard, football linebacker for Denver Broncos, New Orleans Saints, Montreal Alouettes and Toronto Argonauts
 Jeff Libby, hockey defense-man with the New York Islanders

Show business 

 Lew Cody, stage and screen actor
 David E. Kelley, television and film producer, born in Waterville
 Kurt Marshall, model and actor, born in Waterville
 Vaughn Meader, comedian, born in Waterville
 Jamie Sears, American actor, born in Waterville

References 

Waterville, Maine
Waterville